Anatoly Aleksandrovich Tokov (born 17 February 1990) is a Russian mixed martial artist currently fighting in the middleweight division of  Bellator MMA.  Tokov has previously fought in promotions such as: M-1 Global, Fight Nights Global, Rizin Fighting Federation and  Absolute Championship Berkut where Tokov became the one-time Middleweight champion. As of February 7, 2023, he is #4 in the Bellator Middleweight Rankings.

Background 
Anatoly Tokov was born on February 17, 1990, in the city of Tobolsk, in the Tyumen region to a Russian father and Kabardian mother. From adolescence, the boy liked to watch action films with the participation of Jean Claude Van Damme, Jackie Chan and Chuck Norris, which determined his hobbies in the future. Tokov took the first steps at age 15, enrolling in the hand-to-hand combat section under the guidance of trainer Andrei Mikhailovich Sabarov. Just three years after the start of training, he achieved an outstanding result - a victory at the national championship in hand-to-hand combat. A year later, he decided to move to the rapidly gaining popularity of mixed martial arts and decided to pursue a career in mixed martial arts following the birth of his first daughter at the age of 18. Tokov initially wanted to train and pursue a career in boxing; however, in his city of Tobolsk, only hand-to-hand combat was available.  Tokov also would have pursued a career in judo, although this dream was short lived for it was too difficult to commit with because of the distance required to travel to train. 

He achieved his first success at the adult level in the 2008 season, when he became the champion of Russia in the ARB, won several tournaments of Russian and international significance, and fulfilled the standard of a master of sports. He also competed several times in pankration and combat sambo tournaments.

Professional career 
In 2009, Tokov joined the fighting club Red Devil Fighting Team after being invited, along with Sidelnikov, the Nemkov brothers and Moldavsky, to become a part of Fedor Emelianenko’s fight team to help as preparation for Emelianenko’s comeback into professional mixed martial arts. He made his professional debut not long afterwards at the qualifying tournament of the M-1 Global organization in St. Petersburg, defeating his opponent Anatoly Vintovkin by technical knockout with Nemkov at the 2nd minute of the 2nd round finishing the fight with powerful knee blows to the body. Over the next two years, he had six victorious fights, including winning the M-1 Challenge tournament in Astrakhan. He suffered the first defeat in his career in December 2011 by knockout from Magomed Magomedkerimov at the Russian Championship under the S-70 League. Already at the start of the fight, Magomed transferred Anatoly to a defensive position, lying on his back and delivered a knockout blow to the jaw. In 2012, he participated in the M-1 Fighter reality show, broadcast on the Fighter TV channel, and won all three grand prix fights there.

Tokov continued to fight in various Russian promotions between 2012 and 2015, winning 15 fights in a row, creating an impressive MMA record of 21-1 in particular, he defeated experienced fighters such as Albert Duraev, Magomed Ismailov, and Jordan Smith. For 3 years, Anatoly took part in a large number of tournaments, including M-1, DIA and S-70 League, having established himself as one of the best middleweights in Russian MMA.

In 2015, he visited the Rizin Fighting Federation tournament in Japan with Fedor Emelianenko, and knocked American fighter A.J. Matthews in the first round.

Anatoly had to fight with the Chechen fighter Arbi Aguev in the 2015 ACB Lightweight Grand Prix Finals for inaugural ACB Middleweight Championship . In the first 3 rounds, the advantage passed from one athlete to another - both fighters showed beautiful combinations in striking technique, however, Tokov was better at fighting on the ground. At the end of the 3rd round, Aguev makes an attempt to throw the opponent over the thigh, but he himself finds himself below and takes several powerful blows to the head - a gong saves the Chechen athlete from a possible knockout. In round 4, Arby looks more tired and begins to miss more and more direct single blows. At the 4th minute of the round, Anatoly takes the opponent to the ground and carries out a series of finishing blows, after which the referee stops the fight, and Tokov goes to get ready to receive the championship belt. 

After leaving ACB due to a contract dispute, He also had one fight in the Fight Nights promotion, where he defeated the representative of Serbia, Vladimir Filipovich, by unanimous decision.

Six months later, Tokov participates in the M-1 Challenge 73 tournament, where he suffers his 2nd defeat in MMA. Ramazan Emeev managed to win the close bout via majority decision.

Bellator MMA 
In 2017, he signed a contract with the major American organization Bellator MMA and made his debut on the North American continent in February, defeating Francisco France at Bellator 172 by technical knockout.

The second match in the promotion at Bellator 200, Anatoly already in the first minute of the first round grabbed Vladimir Filipovich's neck and choked him out with a guillotine.

Tokov was expected to face John Salter at Bellator 188 on November 16, 2017. However, Tokov pulled out of the bout due to an ACL injury and was replaced by Jason Radcliffe.

In October 2018, he met in the Bellator cage with the titled compatriot Alexander Shlemenko at Bellator 208. The fight turned out to be equal and protracted - in the 15 minutes allotted by the regulations for the duel, none of the fighters could finish the confrontation ahead of schedule. After the end of the 3rd round, Anatoly was recognized as the best by the unanimous decision of the judges.

After successful fights in Bellator, Tokov signed a new, more profitable contract with the promotion for another 3 fights.

On March 22, 2019, he fought his fourth fight in Bellator at Bellator 218 against Gerald Harris. In the first round, Tokov was on the verge of defeat, having been knocked down, but managed to recover and return to the fight, and by the second round he was able to finish the bout via guillotine and win the fight.

Tokov's last fight in Bellator in 2019 was against Hracho Darpinyan at Bellator 229, in which he finished the fight with a TKO stoppage with elbows from crucifix.

After a long layoff, Tokov returned in October 23, 2021, at Bellator 269 against Sharaf Davlatmurodov, winning the bout via split decision.

After the win, Tokov signed another long term contract with the promotion.

In his only bout of 2022, Tokov faced Muhammad Abdullah on June 24, 2022, at Bellator 282, finishing the bout in the first round via ground and pound TKO stoppage.

Tokov faced reigning champ Johnny Eblen for the Bellator Middleweight Championship on February 4, 2023, at Bellator 290. He lost the bout via unanimous decision.

Championships and accomplishments

Mixed martial arts 

 Absolute Championship Akhmat
 ACA Middleweight Championship (One time)
 2015 ACB Middleweight Grand Prix

Personal life 
Anatoly married at the age of 19 to Maria, who are still together to this day and raise 2 daughters, Liza and Snezhana. Despite the fact that the athlete spends a lot of time at training camps in Stary Oskol and other cities of Russia, he connects his future exclusively with Tobolsk. He has a younger brother, Vladimir Tokov, who is also a mixed martial artist.

Has a higher education, graduating from the Tobolsk Pedagogical Institute of Tyumen University.

Mixed martial arts record

|-
|Loss
|align=center|31–3
|Johnny Eblen
|Decision (unanimous)
|Bellator 290
|
|align=center|5
|align=center|5:00
|Inglewood, California, United States
|
|-
|Win
|align=center|31–2
|Muhammad Abdullah
|TKO (punches)
|Bellator 282
|
|align=center|1
|align=center|2:28
|Uncasville, Connecticut, United States
|
|-
|Win
|align=center|30–2
|Sharaf Davlatmurodov
|Decision (split)
|Bellator 269
|
|align=center|3
|align=center|5:00
|Moscow, Russia
|
|-
|Win
|align=center|29–2
|Hracho Darpinyan
|TKO (elbows)
|Bellator 229
|
|align=center|2
|align=center|4:38
|Temecula, California, United States
|
|-
|Win
|align=center|28–2
|Gerald Harris
|Submission (guillotine choke)
|Bellator 218
|
|align=center| 2
|align=center| 0:37
|Thackerville, Oklahoma, United States
| 
|-
|Win
|align=center|27–2
|Alexander Shlemenko
|Decision (unanimous)
|Bellator 208
|
|align=center|3
|align=center|5:00
|Uniondale, New York, United States
|
|-
|Win
|align=center|26–2
|Vladimir Filipovic
|Technical Submission (guillotine choke)
|Bellator 200
|
|align=center|1
|align=center|0:56
|London, England
|
|-
|Win
|align=center|25–2
|Francisco France
|TKO (punches)
|Bellator 172
|
|align=center|2
|align=center|2:24
|San Jose, California, United States
|
|-
|Loss
|align=center|24–2
|Ramazan Emeev
|Decision (majority)
|M-1 Challenge 73
|
|align=center|3
|align=center|5:00
|Nazran, Russia
|
|-
|Win
|align=center|24–1
|Vladimir Filipovic
|Decision (unanimous)
|Fight Nights Global 50 
|
|align=center|3
|align=center|5:00
|St. Petersburg, Russia
|
|-
|Win
|align=center|23–1
|Arbi Aguev
|TKO (punches)
|ACB 38
|
|align=center|4
|align=center|4:19
|Rostov-on-Don, Russia
|
|-
|Win
|align=center|22–1
|A.J. Matthews
|KO (punch)
|Rizin World Grand Prix 2015: Part 1
|
|align=center|1
|align=center|0:55 
|Saitama, Japan
| 
|-
|Win
|align=center|21–1
|Adam Zajac
|TKO (punches)
|ACB 19
|
|align=center|1 
|align=center|2:00 
|Kaliningrad, Russia
|
|-
|Win
|align=center|20–1
|Sergiu Breb
|KO (punch)
|Steel Battle 2
|
|align=center|1
|align=center|4:07
|Stary Oskol, Russia
|
|-
|Win
|align=center|19–1
|Maxim Shvets
|Submission (guillotine choke)
|ACB 15
|
|align=center|2
|align=center|2:31
|Nalchik, Russia
|
|-
|Win
|align=center| 18–1
|Enoc Solves Torres
|TKO (punches)
|M-1 Challenge 54
|
|align=center|3
|align=center|0:53
|St. Petersburg, Russia
|
|-
|Win
|align=center|17–1
|Jordan Smith
|Decision (unanimous)
|Plotforma S-70
|
|align=center|3
|align=center|5:00
|Sochi, Russia
|
|-
|Win
|align=center|16-1
|Vadim Feger
|KO (punch)
|SOMMAF: Steel Battle 1
|
|align=center|1
|align=center|0:12
|Stary Oskol, Russia
|
|-
|Win
|align=center|15–1
|Albert Duraev
|KO (punches)
|M-1 Challenge 46
|
|align=center|1
|align=center|3:21
|St. Petersburg, Russia
|
|-
|Win
|align=center|14–1
|Reinaldo da Silva
|Decision (unanimous)
|TFN: Western Siberian Cup
|
|align=center|2
|align=center|5:00
|Tyumen, Russia
|
|-
|Win
|align=center|13–1
|Islam Yashaev
|Submission (guillotine choke)
|Voronezh MMA Federation: Fight Riot 2
|
|align=center|2
|align=center|2:14
|Voronezh, Russia
|
|-
|Win
|align=center|12–1
|Adam Polgar
|TKO (retirement)
|ANMMA: Liberation
|
|align=center|3
|align=center|2:00
|Belgorod, Russia
|
|-
|Win
|align=center|11–1
|Magomed Ismailov
|Submission (kimura)
|M-1 Challenge 39
|
|align=center|1
|align=center|2:48
|Moscow, Russia
|
|-
|Win
|align=center|10–1
|Yuri Shurov
|Decision (unanimous)
|M-1 Challenge: Grand Finale
|
|align=center|4
|align=center|5:00
|Moscow, Russia
|
|-
|Win
|align=center|9–1
|Rustam Gadzhiev
|Submission (choke)
|M-1 Fighter 2012 Semifinals
|
|align=center|3
|align=center|N/A
|Moscow, Russia
|
|-
|Win
|align=center|8–1
|Pavel Pokatilov
|Decision
|M-1 Fighter 2012 Quarterfinals
|
|align=center|2
|align=center|3:00
|Moscow, Russia
|
|-
|Loss
|align=center|7–1
|Magomed Magomedkerimov
|KO (punch)
|League S-70: First Round
|
|align=center|1
|align=center|1:07
|Volgograd, Russia
|
|-
|Win
|align=center|7–0
|Artur Korchemny
|KO (punch)
|TFN: Siberia vs Urals
|
|align=center|1
|align=center|N/A
|Tyumen, Russia
|
|-
|Win
|align=center|6–0
|Jan Zdansky 
|TKO (punches)
|M-1 Challenge 28
|
|align=center|1
|align=center|4:20
|Astrakhan, Russia
|
|-
|Win
|align=center|5–0
|Arsen Magomedov 
|TKO (punches)
|Corona Cup 2
|
|align=center|1
|align=center|3:14
|Moscow, Russia
|
|-
|Win
|align=center|4–0
|Zurab Kurabanov
|KO (punches)
|Pankration Cup Of Call 2011
|
|align=center|2
|align=center|1:44
|Omsk, Russia
|
|-
|Win
|align=center|3–0
|Rustam Abdurapov
|Submission (armbar)
|L-1: Marshal Govorov Memorial 2010
|
|align=center|2
|align=center|0:40
|St. Petersburg, Russia
|
|-
|Win
|align=center|2–0
|Alexey Katukov
|KO (punch)
|Russian Cities Cup 2010
|
|align=center|2
|align=center|N/A
|Lipetsk, Russia
|
|-
|Win
|align=center|1–0
|Anatoly Vintovkin
|TKO (punches)
|M-1 Challenge: 2009 Selections 9
|
|align=center|2
|align=center|0:59
|St. Petersburg, Russia
|

See also 
 List of current Bellator MMA fighters
 List of male mixed martial artists

References

External links 
  
  

1990 births
Living people
Russian male mixed martial artists
Middleweight mixed martial artists
Mixed martial artists utilizing ARB
Mixed martial artists utilizing sambo
Mixed martial artists utilizing boxing
Mixed martial artists utilizing pankration
Mixed martial artists utilizing wrestling
Bellator male fighters
Russian sambo practitioners